David Barrett may refer to:

 Dave Barrett (1930–2018), former Premier of British Columbia, Canada
 Dave Barrett (journalist) (1955–2018), American radio journalist at CBS Radio News
 David Barrett (American football) (born 1977), American football cornerback
 David Barrett (director), American television director and producer
 David Barrett (entrepreneur), American programmer and entrepreneur
 David Barrett (prosecutor)
 David Barrett (musician) (born 1973), American blues harmonica player, composer, and instructor
 David B. Barrett  (1927–2011), professor and research secretary
 David D. Barrett (1892–1977), American soldier and diplomat
 David L. Barrett (1931–1999), American politician
 David M. Barrett (born c. 1951), American political science professor
 David V. Barrett, British sociologist of religion
 David E. Barrett, professor of mathematics
 David Michael Barrett (born 1971), screenwriter and film producer

See also
 David Barratt, British composer